William Alexander Richardson (January 16, 1811 – December 27, 1875) was a prominent Illinois Democratic politician before and during the American Civil War.

Born near Lexington, Kentucky, Richardson attended Transylvania University, and then proceeded to teach school and study law. He passed the bar exam in 1831 and started his practice in Shelbyville, Illinois. He was an attorney for the state from 1834 to 1835, and was elected representative to the state house, serving from 1836 to 1838. He moved over to the state senate from 1838 to 1842, and then back to the house again from 1844 to 1846, briefly serving as speaker of the lower house during his last term. He was a presidential elector in 1844 for the Democrats.

Biography
Richardson enlisted as a captain in the U.S. Army during the Mexican–American War, and was promoted to the rank of major. After the war, he moved to Quincy, Illinois, and then was elected a U.S congressman to the 30th Congress to fill Stephen A. Douglas's seat. He was then reelected to the 31st, 32nd, 33rd, and 34th Congresses for the same seat (1847 to 1856).

During his time in the House of Representatives, he was the Chairman of the Committee on Territories (32nd–33rd Congresses). He resigned in August 1856 to run for Governor of Illinois. He narrowly lost to fellow representative, and first nominee of the newly established Republican Party William H. Bissell. Richardson took most of south Illinois while Bissell won most of north Illinois, and a couple of counties in the southern part of the state. Bissell won by 4,697 votes (slightly less than 2% of the vote).

After being defeated, Richardson was appointed by President James Buchanan as the Governor of the Nebraska Territory for most of 1858. Richardson resigned near the end of the year.

He was a delegate to 1860 Democratic National Convention from Illinois. He then came back to Washington D.C. as a member of the 37th Congress in 1861. In 1863, he was elected to fill Stephen Douglas's old seat in the United States Senate, defeating incumbent Republican Orville Browning. He was not renominated in 1865 and spent the rest of his life engaged in newspaper work.

He died on December 27, 1875, in Quincy, Illinois, where he is buried.

Richardson County, Nebraska, is named after him.

References

Sources

External links
 

Governors of Nebraska Territory
Illinois lawyers
Democratic Party Illinois state senators
Speakers of the Illinois House of Representatives
People from Quincy, Illinois
People from Shelbyville, Illinois
People of Illinois in the American Civil War
Transylvania University alumni
Centre College alumni
Union (American Civil War) political leaders
Democratic Party United States senators from Illinois
1811 births
1875 deaths
Democratic Party members of the United States House of Representatives from Illinois
19th-century American politicians
19th-century American lawyers